Urohi sometimes spelt as Urhohi is a community in Esan West Local Government Area of Edo State, Nigeria. It is among the several communities in Esanland. The community is governed by King Onojie. In 2019, the fifteenth Onojie of Urohi Kingdom was installed.

See also 
Esanland
Esan people

References 

Populated places in Edo State